Abdul Rauf Khoso is a Pakistani politician who has been a member of the Provincial Assembly of Sindh since August 2018. He previously had served in this role from May 2013 to May 2018.

Early life 

Abdul Rauf Khoso was born on 5 February 1960.

Political career

He was elected to the Provincial Assembly of Sindh as a candidate of Pakistan Peoples Party (PPP) from PS-18 Kashmore-II in the 2013 Sindh provincial election.

He was re-elected to Provincial Assembly of Sindh as a candidate of PPP from PS-4 Kashmore-I in the 2018 Sindh provincial election.

References

Living people
Sindh MPAs 2013–2018
1960 births
Pakistan People's Party MPAs (Sindh)
Sindh MPAs 2018–2023